In sha'Allah, also spelled In shaa Allah, In sha Allah, Insya Allah and İn şa Allah is an Arabic language expression meaning "if God wills" or "God willing". It was mentioned in the Quran which required the use of it when speaking on future events. The phrase is commonly used by Muslims, Arab Christians and Arabic-speakers of other religions to refer to events that one hopes will happen in the future. It expresses the belief that nothing happens unless God wills it, and that his will supersedes all human will.

Other languages
The word  in Asturleonese, Galician (more rarely in this language ) and Portuguese. They all come from the Arabic  ( (using a different word for "if"), from the time of Muslim presence and rule on the Iberian Peninsula. It means "we hope", "I hope", "we wish", "I wish".
The Bulgarian and Macedonian / and Serbo-Croatian  are the South Slav versions of the expression, calqued from Arabic, owing to Ottoman rule over the Balkans. They are used extensively in Bulgaria, Bosnia and Herzegovina, Serbia, Croatia, Slovenia, North Macedonia, and Montenegro, even sometimes by non-theists. They are also widely used in Ukraine and Russia.
In Cypriot Greek, the word  is used with the meaning "hopefully".
In Esperanto,  means "God willing".
Finnish interjection: Jos Luoja suo, meaning "God willing", is used by some artists in popular music to express leaving life to chance/faith/luck.
The term is used in the Indonesian and Malay languages with very similar meanings and spellings, i.e. It is a very common expression in both languages.
A similar expression exists in Maltese:  ("if God wills it"). Maltese is descended from Siculo-Arabic, the Arabic dialect that developed in Sicily and later in Malta between the end of the 9th century and the end of the 12th century.
They mean "God, give" and "if God will give/allow".
In Romanian,  or  means the same.
In Russian,  is a similar expression with the meaning "God willing".
In Tagalog,  means "I hope" or "we hope". It is the synonym of the Tagalog word .
In Urdu, the word is used with the meaning "God willing".

See also

 Besiyata Dishmaya
 By the Grace of God
 Deo volente
 Dhikr
 Mashallah
 Predestination in Islam
 Shahada
 Tahmid
 Tahlil
 Takbir
 Tasbih

References

External links

Arabic words and phrases
Destiny
Religious terminology
Islamic terminology